The 1977 Torneo Godó or Trofeo Conde de Godó was a tennis tournament that took place on outdoor clay courts at the Real Club de Tenis Barcelona in Barcelona, Catalonia in Spain. It was the 25th edition of the tournament and was part of the 1977 Grand Prix circuit. It was held from 17 October 17 until 23 October 1977. First-seeded Björn Borg won the singles title.

Finals

Singles
 Björn Borg defeated  Manuel Orantes 6–2, 7–5, 6–2
 It was Borg's 8th singles title of the year and the 27th of his career.

Doubles
 Wojciech Fibak /  Jan Kodeš defeated  Bob Hewitt /  Frew McMillan 6–0, 6–4

References

External links
 ITF tournament edition details
 Official tournament website
 ATP tournament profile

Barcelona Open (tennis)
Torneo Godo
Torneo Godo
Torneo Godo